= Le Travailleur du Loiret =

- Type: Weekly
- Founded: 1924
- Political alignment: Communist
- Language: French language
- Headquarters: Orléans
- Circulation: 3,600 (1937)

Le Travailleur du Loiret ('The Worker of Loiret') was a communist weekly newspaper published from Orléans, France, founded in 1924. In 1935 it had a circulation of 2,700, by 1937 the circulation had reached 3,600.
